Lithuania Bushido Federation, also known as Bushido Lithuania, is the largest combat sports promotion in Lithuania.

LBF was founded in 1999 with the name Lietuvos Bušido RINGS federacija as the Lithuanian stable-branch of the Japanese promotion RINGS and held its first event in 2000. RINGS fighter Volk Han was influential in starting the promotion.

As of 2012, LBF unites 34 Lithuanian sports clubs and has been holding the international mixed martial arts series Bushido Fighting Championship, domestic MMA series S.W.A.T., international kickboxing series King of Kings, international MMA series with Hero's Lithuania brand, as well as events carrying the brands of their partners such as K-1, Shooto, ADCC, Pancrase, ZST and Shootboxing.

This MMA organisation will partner Rizin Fighting Federation for the RIZIN FIGHTING WORLD GRAND-PRIX event to be held on December 29 and 31 2015. The former Pride FC Heavyweight champion Fedor Emelianenko will headline the NYE Rizin FF main event.

Media coverage 
A 3-year global broadcast deal with DAZN was announced 30 September 2022.

Notes

References

External links
Bushido Lithuania events at Sherdog

See also
 King of Kings

Mixed martial arts organizations
Kickboxing organizations
1999 establishments in Lithuania
Organizations based in Vilnius